Shyam Sunder Rao is a former Indian volleyball player and coach. He is a recipient of Arjuna award and, in 1995, the Dronacharya award.

References

Indian men's volleyball players
Recipients of the Dronacharya Award
Recipients of the Arjuna Award
Volleyball players from Andhra Pradesh
Living people
Year of birth missing (living people)